Five Rivers is a tributary of the Alsea River in the U.S. state of Oregon, in Lane, Lincoln, Benton counties. The name Five Rivers refers to the relative importance to the stream of five of its tributaries: Alder, Cougar, Buck, Crab, and Cherry creeks.

Geography
Five Rivers meanders generally north through the Siuslaw National Forest from its headwaters in the Central Oregon Coast Range west of Blachly in Lane County. It enters the Alsea River near Stoney Mountain,  from the Alsea's mouth on the Pacific Ocean at Waldport.

About  further downstream is another rural community, Fisher, near the confluence of Five Rivers with Crab Creek. Fisher School Bridge, a covered bridge for pedestrians, crosses Five Rivers at Fisher.

Recreation
Five Rivers Launch is a day-use area near the Five Rivers – Alsea confluence and the intersection of Five Rivers Road with Oregon Route 34, which runs along the Alsea. Managed by Lincoln County, the launch includes a gravel boat ramp and a parking area. The launch is only for drift boats such as canoes and kayaks.

Tributaries
Named tributaries of Five Rivers from source to mouth are Prindel, Lord, Summers, Cedar, and Fendall creeks followed by Green River. Then come Crazy, Alder, Crab, Cougar, Buck, and Cherry creeks. Below that are Cascade, Swamp, Lobster, Elk, and Bear creeks.

See also
 List of rivers of Oregon

References

Alsea River
Rivers of Benton County, Oregon
Rivers of Lane County, Oregon
Rivers of Lincoln County, Oregon
Rivers of Oregon